Alana Ross is a Canadian politician, who was elected to the Legislative Assembly of Saskatchewan in the 2020 Saskatchewan general election. She represents the electoral district of Prince Albert Northcote as a member of the Saskatchewan Party.

References 

Living people
21st-century Canadian politicians
21st-century Canadian women politicians
Saskatchewan Party MLAs
Women MLAs in Saskatchewan
Year of birth missing (living people)